Shida District may means:

 Shida District, Miyagi
 Shida District, Shizuoka